Nurabad (also Romanized as Nūrābād) is a city and capital of Mamasani County, Fars Province, Iran.  At the 2016 census, its population was 117,000,

City news sites:
 Mamasani

Climate

References

Nurabad mamsani,_Fars
Cities in Fars Province